Rajiv Gandhi Stadium may refer to:

 Rajiv Gandhi Indoor Stadium, an indoor stadium in Ernakulam, Kerala, India
 Rajiv Gandhi International Cricket Stadium, Dehradun, a cricket stadium in Dehradun, Uttarakhand, India
 Rajiv Gandhi International Cricket Stadium, Hyderabad, a cricket stadium in Hyderabad, Telangana, India
 Rajiv Gandhi International Indoor Stadium, Kottayam, an indoor stadium in Kottayam, Kerala, India
 Rajiv Gandhi Sports Complex, a multipurpose sports stadium in Rohtak, Haryana
 Rajiv Gandhi Stadium, Aizawl, a football stadium in Aizawl, Mizoram, India